was a Japanese special effects director who worked on eleven films in a career spanning twenty-one years. Tsukiji co-designed Gamera with Masao Yagi, Noriaki Yuasa, and Akira Inoue.

Biography

Early life 
Tsukiji was born on September 5, 1923, in Ōimachi, Shinagawa, Tokyo. Tsukiji's family lived across the street from the Oikan movie theater, he went to the movies nearly every day from the age of 5 to 6.

Early career and war propaganda

Daiei years

Filmography

Special effects 

 Warning from Space (1956) [with Tōru Matoba]
 Panther's Eye (1956)
 Nichiren and the Great Mongol Invasion (1958)
 The Precipice (1958)
 Hanran (1959)
 Ten Dark Women (1961)
 The Great Wall (1962)
 Giant Horde Beast Nezura (1964)
 Money Talks (1964)
 Gamera the Giant Monster (1965)
 Gamera: Super Monster (1980)

Producer 

 Hatsukoi: Natsu no Kioku (2009)

Legacy 
A fictional character based on Tsukiji would appear in the 2021 film Nezura 1964.

References

Sources

External links 

 

1923 births
2012 deaths
Special effects people
20th-century apocalypticists
Japanese film producers
People from Shinagawa